Botryococcaceae is a family of green algae in the class Trebouxiophyceae.

References

External links

Trebouxiophyceae families
Trebouxiales